The Zhudong Timber Industry Exhibition Hall is a museum about timber in Zhudong Township, Hsinchu County, Taiwan.

History
The exhibition hall was established in 1943.

Exhibition
The exhibition hall features the history of timber industry in Taiwan and traditional logging equipment.

Transportation
The exhibition hall is accessible within walking distance south west of Zhudong Station of Taiwan Railways.

See also
 List of museums in Taiwan

References

External links

1943 establishments in Taiwan
Industry museums in Taiwan
Museums established in 1943
Museums in Hsinchu County